Mykola Ivanovych Kudritsky (6 October 1962, in Nikopol – 16 March 1994, in Ra'anana, Israel) was a Ukrainian professional football player.

Kudrytsky perished in a car crash while heading back home early in the morning. He was ejected out of his car when it flipped.

Honours
Dnipro Dnipropetrovsk
 Soviet Top League champion: 1988
 Soviet Top League runner-up: 1987, 1989
 USSR Super Cup winner: 1988
 Soviet Cup winner: 1989
 USSR Federation Cup winner: 1986, 1989
 USSR Federation Cup finalist: 1990

Notes

External links
 Career summary by KLISF
 They played in Israel. Mykola Kudrytsky. Israelfootball.com. 3 November 2003
 

1962 births
1994 deaths
Road incident deaths in Israel
Soviet footballers
Ukrainian footballers
Ukrainian expatriate footballers
Expatriate footballers in Israel
Ukrainian expatriate sportspeople in Israel
FC Elektrometalurh-NZF Nikopol players
FC Kryvbas Kryvyi Rih players
FC Dnipro players
Bnei Yehuda Tel Aviv F.C. players
Soviet Top League players
Association football midfielders
People from Nikopol, Ukraine
Sportspeople from Dnipropetrovsk Oblast